Boundaries of the Heart is a 1988 film starring Wendy Hughes.

It was shot in Coolgardie, near Kalgoorlie in Western Australia.

Plot 
Shearer Andy John Hargreaves returns to Coolgardie, as he's done every year since he was a young shearer. Stella Wendy Hughes welcomes Andy warmly but her interest cools as old tensions between them are renewed. A young English schoolteacher finds himself stranded when his car breaks down. Stella helps him recover from sunstroke and seduces him. Andy realises that Stella has used him for years, playing his attentions off against any man who takes her fancy. He decides to sell his horses and truck and leave for Sydney.

Stella
The movie was based on Stella a 1963 British TV play. It was written by Australian Peter Yeldham and features several Australians in the cast.

Premise
Stella, a barmaid, is turning 40 and reflects on her life.

Cast
 Katharine Blake as Stella
 Duncan Lamont 
 Reg Lye as Blanco White 
 Joseph O'Conor as Billy	
 Charles Tingwell as Arthur Pearson
 Wendy Gifford as June Thompson

Production
It was inspired by a person in a bar Yeldham saw when seventeen.

The play was well received and screened in a number of countries.

The play was adapted into radio in 1964.

Release 
The film went straight to video, via distributor Filmpac, but the only versions available were cropped in 4:3 format.

References

External links 
 
 Boundaries of the Heart (1988) at Ozmovies

1988 films
Australian drama films
1980s English-language films
Films directed by Lex Marinos
1980s Australian films